Timothy Perry Shriver (born August 29, 1959) is an American disability rights activist, film producer, and former educator who has been Chairman of Special Olympics since 1996 and is the founder of UNITE. He is a member of the Kennedy family as the third child of Eunice Kennedy Shriver (who founded the Special Olympics), and Sargent Shriver, who helped found the Peace Corps.

Early life and education
Timothy Shriver was born in St. Elizabeth's Hospital in Boston, Massachusetts to Sargent Shriver, a former United States Ambassador to France and the Democratic Party's vice-presidential candidate in 1972, and Eunice Kennedy Shriver, the founder of Special Olympics. He was raised as a Catholic along with his siblings, Bobby Shriver, Maria Shriver, Mark Shriver, and Anthony Shriver. He is a member of the Kennedy Family through his mother, Eunice Kennedy Shriver, a younger sister of President John F. Kennedy.

Shriver graduated from St. Albans School. He received his B.A. from Yale University in 1981, his M.A. in religion and religious education from The Catholic University of America in 1988, and his Ph.D. in education from the University of Connecticut in 1996.

Career
Shriver spent 15 years in public education—some in special education—as a teacher. He served as a high school teacher in the New Haven, Connecticut public school system, and as a counselor and teacher in the University of Connecticut branch of the Upward Bound program for disadvantaged youth. He became a Fellow at the School Development Program at the Yale Child Study Center.

He was instrumental in establishing the Social Development Project at the public schools in New Haven, Connecticut and also established the Collaborative for Academic, Social and Emotional Learning at the University of Illinois at Chicago.

He was the executive producer on The Ringer, a co-producer on Amistad and the Disney movie The Loretta Claiborne Story, and has served as a producer or co-producer on shows for the American Broadcasting Company, the National Broadcasting Corporation, and the TNT cable channel.  He is currently a board member of Malaria No More, a New York-based nonprofit that was launched at the 2006 White House Summit with the goal of ending all deaths caused by malaria.

He is currently the Chairman of Special Olympics. Timothy and his brother Anthony Shriver have recently aligned the Special Olympics and Best Buddies (founded by Anthony Shriver), to create the Eunice Kennedy Shriver Challenge event, aimed to encourage greater acceptance and inclusion for those with intellectual and developmental disabilities, a condition that affected their late aunt Rosemary Kennedy. Shriver has served on the Board of Directors of The Future Project, a national initiative to empower young people to discover their passion and change the world, since its founding. And he has written a memoir Fully Alive: Discovering What Matters Most, published by Farrar, Straus and Giroux (2014).

In recent years, Shriver stepped down as CEO from the Special Olympics to launch UNITE, a national initiative for bringing Americans across divides together in common purpose to address universal challenges that can only be solved together.

Activism
As chairman of Special Olympics, Timothy Shriver has campaigned against mocking of and discrimination against participants in Special Olympics. He has specifically argued against use of what he calls "the R word," meaning retarded, stating that the word, "retard", is very offensive and people with intellectual disabilities should be respected and treated like all other people.

In 2008, Shriver and supporters called for a boycott of the movie Tropic Thunder, claiming that it mocks people with mental disabilities. The movie is written, produced by, and stars Ben Stiller.  In a commentary for CNN, Shriver wrote in part,

Fully Alive: Discovering What Matters Most
In November 2014, Shriver released a book called Fully Alive: Discovering What Matters Most.

Personal life
Shriver married Linda Potter (born January 13, 1956) on May 31, 1986 at Dahlgren Chapel on the Georgetown University campus. They reside in Chevy Chase, Maryland and have five children: Sophia Rose Shriver (born 1987); Timothy Perry Shriver, Jr. (born 1988); Samuel Kennedy Shriver (born 1992); Kathleen Francis Shriver (born 1994); Caroline Elizabeth Shriver (born 1997).

Awards and honors
2022 Honorary degree from Georgetown University
2019 Honorary degree from Fordham University
2012 Honorary degree from Villanova University
2011 Honorary degree from La Salle University
 Honorary degree from University of Connecticut
 Honorary degree from Niagara University
 Honorary degree from Albertus Magnus College
 The Medal of the City of Athens, Greece
 1995 Connecticut Citizen of the Year.
 Honorary degree from Loyola University
 Honorary degree from New England College
 The Order de Manuel Amador Guerrera of the Republic of Panama
 Presidential Medallion from University of Illinois
 Honorary degree from Springfield College
Walter Camp 2015 "Distinguished American"
Honorary degree from Saint Peter's University

Board membership
American Association on Intellectual and Developmental Disabilities
Board of the Education Commission of the States' Compact for Learning and Citizenship
Chairman, Collaborative for Academic, Social, and Emotional Learning
Council on Foreign Relations
The Edison Schools Incorporated
The Frank Porter Graham Child Development Center at the University of North Carolina at Chapel Hill
Board of Advisors for HealthCorps
Chairman UNESCO at IT Tralee (United Nations Educational, Scientific and Cultural Organization)

See also
 Kennedy family tree
Siblings of Timothy Shriver:

 Maria Owings Shriver (b. 1955)
 Mark Kennedy Shriver (b. 1964)
 Robert Sargent Shriver III (b. 1954)
 Anthony Paul Kennedy Shriver (b. 1965)

Further reading

References

External links
Religion from the Heart: Re-thinking, Re-feeling and Reviving Faith By: Timothy Shriver

Full Biography from the Special Olympics Website
The Collaborative for Academic, Social, and Emotional Learning
Malaria No More
" Timothy & Anthony Shriver — Eunice’s Legacy". ABILITY Magazine. Aug/Sept 2010.

1959 births
American film producers
Schoolteachers from Connecticut
Connecticut Democrats
American disability rights activists
Kennedy family
Living people
American nonprofit executives
People from Boston
People from New Haven, Connecticut
People from Potomac, Maryland
Shriver family
Special Olympics
St. Albans School (Washington, D.C.) alumni
Catholic University of America alumni
University of Connecticut alumni
Washington, D.C., Democrats
Yale University alumni
Catholics from Massachusetts
Catholics from Connecticut
Catholics from Maryland